The Principality of Snake Hill, also known simply as Snake Hill is a self-proclaimed independent sovereign state (micronation), located near Mudgee in New South Wales, Australia. Snake Hill has roughly hundreds of citizens, and claims land the size of Monaco. Snake Hill claimed independence on 2 September 2003, and Princess Paula claimed it was a right to secede, citing "The U.S., as you well know, seceded from England in 1776, It’s a remedial right, a last resort."

History 
A family of Australian residents could no longer afford to pay taxes, and after litigation over a mortgage and being inspired by the Principality of Hutt River, they did legal research and came to the conclusion that forming a country would be completely legal under Australian law, and they thus declared independence on 2 September 2003.

The micronation was featured in Lonely Planet's Micronations: The Lonely Planet Guide to Home-Made Nations, published in 2006.

In 2010, Helena was crowned Princess Helena after the 2010 death of her husband, Prince Paul, who was allegedly assassinated by a sniper. That same year, Princess Paula, Judy Lattas of Macquarie University and George Cruickshank of the Empire of Atlantium organised and hosted an intermicronational summit called PoliNation at Dangar Island in Sydney.

In late February 2011, a judge of the Supreme Court of New South Wales dismissed the Snake Hillers' argument that the bank's actions were outside the jurisdiction of the court, and that it was a matter of international law and must be referred to the High Court of Australia or the International Court of Justice. Princess Paula continued to appear frequently in courts within New South Wales between 2011 and 2014.

Culture 
Snake Hill has two main newspapers, The Snake Hill Gazette and Snake Hill Women. Snake Hill also claims to operate a church and issue its own currency.

Royalty 
Princess Helena is the head of state of Snake Hill, who ascended to the throne after the death of her husband Prince Paul. Princess Helena's daughter is Princess Paula.

See also 
List of micronations

References

Bibliography

External links
Official Facebook account
Official blog
The Snake Hill Gazette, Archived

2003 establishments in Australia
Micronations in Australia
Monarchy in Australia
Principalities
States and territories established in 2003